Northern Powergrid Holdings Company (formerly CE Electric UK Funding Company) is an electrical distribution company based in Newcastle Upon Tyne in England. It is the owner of Northern Powergrid (Northeast) plc (formerly Northern Electric Distribution Limited (NEDL)) and Northern Powergrid (Yorkshire) plc (formerly Yorkshire Electricity Distribution plc (YEDL)) which are the distribution network operators for the North East England and Yorkshire regions and the North Lincolnshire area.

History
The company was created after the takeover of Northern Electric by CalEnergy in 1996. The company disposed of the supply business of Northern Electric to Innogy plc in 2001 in exchange for the distribution business of Yorkshire Electricity. Thus it represents the electricity distribution systems of the former North Eastern Electricity Board and Yorkshire Electricity Board, which were privatised in 1990.

Network
Northern Powergrid is an electricity distribution business, delivering electricity on behalf of suppliers from the national transmission system to 3.9 million domestic and business customers.

Covering an area of 25,000 square kilometres, Northern Powergrid's network extends from north Northumberland, south to the Humber and northern Lincolnshire, and from the east coast to the Pennines. The network consists of more than 63,000 substations and around 96,000 kilometres of overhead line and underground cables.

Ownership and structure
Northern Powergrid is a wholly owned subsidiary of Berkshire Hathaway Energy.

On 1 November 2011 Northern Powergrid was rebranded from CE Electric UK. The new name is intended to give a better customer representation of the business, its location and operations.

References

External links 

 Northern Powergrid

Berkshire Hathaway
Companies based in Tyne and Wear
Electric power companies of the United Kingdom
Distribution companies of the United Kingdom
Companies based in Newcastle upon Tyne
1996 establishments in England
Energy companies established in 1996
Energy companies
Companies established in 1996